Thursday at One was an Australian daytime television series which aired from 1957 to 1960 on Melbourne station GTV-9. A "programme for the housewife", the running time was as long as two hours.

Each episode included either two or three hosts. The hosts of the series varied during the run, but included Eric Pearce, Bert Newton, Barry McQueen, Jessie Matthews, Laurel Young, Geraldine Dillon, Lesley Webster, Evie Hayes, Judy Ann Ford and Binny Lum.

In the 1 August 1957 episode, a woman named Mrs. Yamomoto appeared to demonstrate Japanese flower arranging. This may have been one of the first instances of an Asian making a guest appearance on an Australian television program.

As live Australian daytime television series were rarely recorded during the run of the series, it is unlikely (though not impossible) that any complete episodes still exist. Women's World, an ABC series which aired during the same era and which was also aimed at the housewives, does however have several existing episodes and episode segments at the National Archives of Australia and National Film and Sound Archive, though these are not available for viewing.

References

External links

Nine Network original programming
1957 Australian television series debuts
1960 Australian television series endings
Australian non-fiction television series
Black-and-white Australian television shows
English-language television shows
Australian live television series